The Happy Housewife is a 2010 Dutch-language film directed by Antoinette Beumer. It stars Carice van Houten as Lea, a housewife who has trouble adjusting to the birth of her son.

External links
 

2010 films
Dutch romantic comedy-drama films
2010s Dutch-language films
Films scored by Junkie XL
Films about families